Section 40 of the Constitution of Australia provides that questions in the House of Representatives shall be determined by majority vote, excluding that of the Speaker.

If there is a tie, then the Speaker has a casting vote. The Speaker does not have to use this vote, and if they choose not to do so, then the question is answered in the negative.

Unlike in the Senate, tied votes in the House of Representatives are rare. From Federation until the end of 2004, there have been only 21 occasions on which a Speaker or Deputy Speaker has chosen to use their casting vote.

Interpretation
Aside from the Speaker, the Deputy Speaker, Second Deputy Speaker or any other person elected to perform the Speaker's duties under section 36 of the Constitution has a casting vote in the case of a tie.

A member of the Speaker's Panel does not have a casting vote, because they are nominated by the Speaker, not elected by the House.

Drafting
The Parliament of Victoria suggested that the Speaker should be able to vote on constitutional amendments even when the votes are not equal (but in the case of a tie, they would not get a second vote and the amendment would be rejected).

Section 128 of the Constitution says that constitutional amendments require an absolute majority in both houses to be passed - a majority of the total number of MPs, not just those present and voting. For this reason, the Victorian Parliament thought that the Speaker's vote might be necessary to achieve the required number of MPs.

This suggestion was rejected at the 1897 Sydney Constitutional Convention.

See also
Section 23 of the Constitution of Australia (the equivalent section in the Senate)

References

Australian constitutional law